Gottlieb Fässler (born 13 April 1934) is a Swiss gymnast. He competed in eight events at the 1964 Summer Olympics.

References

1934 births
Living people
Swiss male artistic gymnasts
Olympic gymnasts of Switzerland
Gymnasts at the 1964 Summer Olympics
Place of birth missing (living people)
20th-century Swiss people